The yellow-fronted barbet (Psilopogon flavifrons) is an Asian barbet, which is an endemic resident breeder in Sri Lanka, where it inhabits subtropical and tropical moist forests, wetlands, plantations and rural gardens up to an altitude of .
It has green plumage with a yellow crown and blue patches below the eyes, on the throat and the chin. It feeds on berries, fruits and occasionally insects. It nests in a tree hole, where it lays 2-3 eggs.

In culture

In Sri Lanka, this bird is known as mukalang kottoruwa - මූකලන් කොට්ටෝරුවා in Sinhala language. Yellow-fronted barbet appears on a 5 rupee Sri Lankan postal stamp,

References

Psilopogon
Birds of Sri Lanka
Birds described in 1816
Taxa named by Georges Cuvier